Veneranda may be:
Fernando Veneranda
Veneranda Nzambazamariya
Saint Veneranda
Gelechia veneranda